Bridal Veil Falls is a waterfall in the DuPont State Forest, on the Little River, near Brevard, North Carolina.

Geology
The waterfall begins as a slide which drops over a ledge approximately four feet high. The river then continues down a long, sloping, ever-steepening granite slope before plunging into some small pools or against large rock slabs at the bottom. A portion of the river drops off a 25' cascade on river left at the bottom.

Visiting the falls
Access to the falls is from the forest's Fawn Lake parking area by hiking or bicycle by going past Fawn Lake, the airstrip, and the horse barn, or from the Buck Forest parking area by crossing the covered bridge, turning right, and following this road past Lake Julia to the falls. Access to the falls by vehicle may also be allowed for handicapped persons. A wide gravel road travels within several hundred feet of the falls, where a gentle, graveled path descends to the base. There is a viewing platform halfway down this trail and a bike rack at the bottom.

While it is possible to go behind portions of the falls and cross the river, or to walk up the wide, open slab of rock beside the falls when the rock is not wet or slippery, such activities are potentially dangerous.  Visitors should exercise caution when crossing any stream or venturing near any waterfall.

In popular culture
The waterfall was featured in scenes in the films The Last of the Mohicans and The Hunger Games.

Nearby falls
 Connestee Falls and Batson Creek Falls
 High Falls
 Hooker Falls
 Key Falls
 Triple Falls

External links
 North Carolina Waterfalls Dupont State Forest Page

Protected areas of Transylvania County, North Carolina
Waterfalls of North Carolina
DuPont State Forest
Waterfalls of Transylvania County, North Carolina